Act a Fool is the debut studio album by American West Coast hip hop artist King Tee. It was released on November 15, 1988 via Capitol Records. Audio production was handled by DJ Pooh and King Tee himself with Tim Devine as executive producer. It also features guest appearances provided by Mixmaster Spade and Breeze on the track "Just Clowning". The album peaked at number 125 on the US Billboard 200 chart and number 35 on the Top R&B/Hip-Hop Albums chart. Its title track reached #26 on the Hot Rap Songs chart, and "Bass", which is remixed on this album, reached #19 on the same chart.

Five of the eleven tracks of Act a Fool were later included on the rapper's greatest hits album Ruff Rhymes: Greatest Hits Collection.

Track listing

Sample credits
Act a Fool
"Give the Baby Anything the Baby Wants" by Joe Tex
"I Gotcha" by Joe Tex
"Lover Jones" by Johnny "Guitar" Watson
"The Back Down" by Richard Pryor
"New Year's Eve" by Richard Pryor
Ko Rock Stuff
"Cardova" by The Meters
The Coolest
"Cissy Strut" by The Meters
Flirt
"Eric B. Is President" by Eric B. & Rakim
"I Know You Got Soul" by Eric B. & Rakim
"AJ Scratch" by Kurtis Blow
"Dazz" by Brick
"Flirt" by Cameo
Bass (Remix)
"Get Up To Get Down" by Brass Construction 
Guitar Playin'
"You're a Customer" by EPMD
"Slippin' into Darkness" by War
Payback's a Mutha
"The Payback (Intro)" by James Brown
"I Gotcha" by Joe Tex
"Slippin' into Darkness" by War 
Just Clowning
"Aqua Boogie (A Psychoalphadiscobetabioaquadoloop)" by Parliament
"Da Butt" by Experience Unlimited

Personnel
 Roger McBride – main artist, producer (tracks: 5, 8, 11)
 Frank Antonia Williams – featured artist (track 10)
 M.C. Breeze – featured artist (track 11)
 Keith Cooley – scratches
 Mark S. Jordan – producer (tracks: 1-4, 6-10), scratches
 Tim "Mastermind" Devine – executive producer
 Vachik Aghaniantz – engineering (tracks: 2-11), mixing (tracks: 2-9, 11)
 Chuck Valle – engineering (track 1)
 Steve Ett – mixing (track 1)
 Donovan Smith – mixing (track 10)
 Bernie Grundman – mastering
 Glen E. Friedman – photography

Album singles

Chart positions
Album

Singles

References

External links

1988 debut albums
King Tee albums
Capitol Records albums
Albums produced by DJ Pooh